Tihul River may refer to:
 Tihul River (Dorna), in Suceava County, Romania
 Tih, a tributary of the Răstolița in Mureș County, Romania